Poraniidae is a family of starfishes in the order Valvatida.

Characteristics
Members of the family Poraniidae have a moderately well-developed row of marginal plates forming a distinct margin along the edge of both disc and arms. The aboral surface is covered with thick, naked skin, free from spines or pedicellariae but with scattered groups of papulae. There are no papulae or pedicellariae on the oral surface and the tube feet are always in two series.

Genera
This family includes the following genera according to the World Register of Marine Species:
 Bathyporania Mah & Foltz, 2014
 Chondraster Verrill, 1895
 Clavaporania Mah & Foltz, 2014
 Culcitopsis Verrill, 1914
 Glabraster A.H. Clark, 1916
 Marginaster Perrier, 1881
 Porania Gray, 1840
 Poraniomorpha Danielssen & Koren, 1881
 Poraniopsis Perrier, 1891
 Spoladaster Fisher, 1940
 Tylaster Danielssen & Koren, 1881

References

 

 
Echinoderm families
Taxa named by Edmond Perrier